Quikscript (also known as the Read Alphabet and Second Shaw) is an alphabet which is intended as a replacement for traditional English orthography with the Latin alphabet. It is a compact phonemic orthography, designed to be comfortably and quickly written. Quikscript has been adapted for other languages, using the same letters for phonemes absent in English phonology.

Origins and history

Read organized a lengthy public testing phase of Shavian by some 500 users from around the world who spoke different dialects of English. Once he had analyzed the results of those tests, Read decided to revise Shavian to incorporate a number of improvements to make it both easier and faster to write. He called the revised alphabet "Quikscript". In 1966, he published the Quikscript manual which set out the alphabet's rationale, and briefly discussed different possible methods of alphabet reform. The manual provides comprehensive instructions regarding the use of the alphabet along with reading samples.

Description

Each Quikscript letter represents one, and only one, English phoneme. There are 25 consonants and 15 vowels, 40 letters in all. The letters are designed to be written easily, each requiring only one (usually curved) stroke of pen.

Just as in the Roman alphabet, there are short letters (e.g. a, c, e, m, and n), written between the base writing line and the "upper parallel" (as Read calls it), tall letters (e.g. b, d, f, k, and t), which ascend above the top of the short letters, and deep letters (e.g. g, j, p and y), which descend below the base writing line. Quikscript, however, makes better use of these possibilities with 11 tall, 11 deep, and 18 short letters. All vowels have short letter shapes, and the most common phonemes have the simplest letter shapes.

Similar sounding phonemes have similar letter shapes, for example:
 Long vowels and glides are written with a larger bend or loop, while short vowels have a simpler shape.
 Every voiced consonant is written with a deep letter similar in shape to the corresponding voiceless consonant which is written with a tall letter.

While the Roman alphabet has two distinct forms for each letter, designated minuscule and majuscule, most letters in Quikscript have only one form. Names and proper nouns are preceded with a mid-line "name-dot" (·) which is sufficient to distinguish them from ordinary words.

Senior Quikscript
Beginners learn Junior Quikscript first. Each word is spelled "as it is spoken".  Each letter is written separately from the next so that it is equivalent to what is termed "printing" in the Roman alphabet. Some people may prefer Junior Quikscript for printed texts as readers are used to the Roman alphabet being printed in that manner.

Senior Quikscript introduces a number of advanced techniques which save time in writing. The most obvious difference is that Senior encourages ligatures as long as the shapes of the letters are not altered.  The design of the alphabet fosters these natural connections, as each Quikscript letter either begins or ends on the base line or the upper parallel.  This structure permits letters to connect easily yet maintains the shapes of the individual letters because there are no connecting strokes between letters as there are in cursive Roman alphabet writing. It is common that Senior writing will have several conjoined letters in a row, but when such a connection is not possible, the letters are simply left unconnected.  Read added a very small number of alternative letter forms, which permit even more letters to connect easily, along with a number of abbreviations for the most common English words, further reducing the space requirement for printed material and hence the costs of physical publication; it is the writer's choice whether to use them or not.

Senior Quikscript also introduces the concept of half-letters.  Read recognized that the top half of several tall letters and the bottom half of several deep letters are sufficient to clearly distinguish them.  Therefore, the portion of the vertical shafts of those letters which lie between the base line and upper parallel can be discarded with no effect to legibility.  Half-letters increase the number of letters which can be conjoined, yielding several benefits:
 the alphabet's appearance becomes more cursive and fluid, which is aesthetically appealing;
 it speeds up handwriting because fewer pen-lifts are required; and
 most importantly, it increases the variability and distinctiveness of word-shapes, improving word recognition and increasing the average reading speed.

Examples

References in literature
Book two of the popular Cole's Funny Picture Books, published in Australia by E. W. Cole at the turn of the 20th century, was revised in 1979 to include an article introducing Quikscript under the name Second Shaw.

See also
 Featural writing system
 Pronunciation respelling

References

External links
Quikscript Outpost
Quikscript page at Omniglot.com
Quikscript.net
World English Bible in Quikscript – a work in progress to transcribe the World English Bible.
Quikscript Cheat Sheet
Quikscript message board at groups.io

English spelling reform
Phonetic alphabets
Writing systems introduced in 1966
Shavian alphabet